Wang Kunlun (August 1, 1902–August 23, 1985), birth name Wang Ruyu (王汝虞), was a Chinese politician who held high-profile positions, at different times, in both the Nationalist and Communist parties. Born 1902 in Baoding,  Hebei province to a wealthy household, he participated in the May Fourth Movement while studying at Peking University and became involved with Chinese revolutionaries, at one point meeting in person with Dr. Sun Yat-sen. He joined the Nationalist party as a left-leaning member and served as Chief Secretary of the Political Department of the Headquarters of the National Revolutionary Army during the Northern Expedition, but became disillusioned with Chiang Kai-shek's leadership after Chiang initiated a major crackdown against Communists in April 1927. He subsequently joined the Communist Party in secret and used his political positions within the Nationalist government to aid the Communists. He was among a group of members of the Kuomintang who broke away to form the Revolutionary Committee of the Kuomintang in 1948. He would serve various government positions after the Communist victory, including vice-mayor of Beijing and vice-chairman of the National Committee of the Chinese People's Political Consultative Conference.

References

1902 births
1985 deaths
Politicians from Baoding
Republic of China politicians from Hebei
People's Republic of China politicians from Hebei
Members of the Kuomintang
Chinese Communist Party politicians from Hebei
Vice Chairpersons of the National Committee of the Chinese People's Political Consultative Conference
Beijing No. 4 High School alumni
Redologists
Members of the Standing Committee of the 1st National People's Congress
Members of the Standing Committee of the 2nd National People's Congress
Members of the Standing Committee of the 3rd National People's Congress
Members of the Standing Committee of the 5th National People's Congress
Members of the Standing Committee of the 1st Chinese People's Political Consultative Conference
Members of the 3rd Chinese People's Political Consultative Conference
Members of the 4th Chinese People's Political Consultative Conference